The Lefty McFadden Invitational was a mid-season college ice hockey tournament first played in 2002. It was Discontinued after 2007.

History
In 2002, a college ice hockey tournament was founded in honor of long-time executive Lefty McFadden. Because he had worked as a sports writer for Dayton Daily News and been both GM and vice president of the Dayton Gems, the Nutter Center in Dayton, Ohio was a logical place to hold the tournament. The nearest Division I team, Miami, served as host for the tournament and was conducted at the beginning of the season. Just over two years into the tournament's existence, Lefty McFadden died at the age of 81. The series survived for two more years before going on hiatus .

The tournament returned in 2007 with Ohio State as host but was not renewed after the season.

Results

Game results

2002

2003

2004

2005

2007

Participating teams

References

 
 

Sports competitions in Ohio
College sports in Ohio
College ice hockey tournaments in the United States
Recurring sporting events established in 2002
2002 establishments in Ohio
2007 disestablishments in Ohio
Ice hockey in Ohio